The Telecoms crash was a stock market crash that occurred in 2001, after the bursting of the dot-com bubble.

It was called "the biggest and fastest rise and fall in business history".

Causes
Partially a result of greed and excessive optimism, especially about the growth of data traffic fueled by the rise of the Internet, in the five years after the Telecommunications Act of 1996 went into effect, telecommunications companies invested more than $500 billion, mostly financed with debt, into laying fiber optic cable, adding new switches, and building wireless networks. In many areas, such as the Dulles Technology Corridor in Virginia, governments funded technology infrastructure and created favorable business and tax law to encourage companies to expand. The growth in capacity vastly outstripped the growth in demand. Spectrum auctions for 3G in the United Kingdom in April 2000, led by Chancellor of the Exchequer Gordon Brown, raised £22.5 billion. In Germany, in August 2000, the auctions raised £30 billion. A 3G spectrum auction in the United States in 1999 had to be re-run when the winners defaulted on their bids of $4 billion. The re-auction netted 10% of the original sales prices. When financing became hard to find as the dot-com bubble burst, the high debt ratios of these companies led to bankruptcy. The industry owed a trillion dollars "much of which will never be repaid and will have to be written off by investors" according to a testimony by Federal Communications Commission Chairman Michael Powell to the Senate Commerce Committee on July 30, 2002. Bond investors recovered just over 20% of their investments.

However, several telecom executives sold stock before the crash including Philip Anschutz, who reaped $1.9 billion, Joseph Nacchio, who reaped $248 million, and Gary Winnick, who sold $748 million worth of shares.

Contrary view
Paul Klemperer, Oxford University economics professor and adviser to the UK government in its 3G auction, has disputed whether the crash should be blamed on the auction rather than broader economic problems. While agreeing that the licence bidders may have been mistaken in bidding as high as they did, and that the money was a transfer from shareholders to the governments, he argued that the one off and up front sunk costs of the auction should have had no effect when considering the profitability of future investment and should not have significantly affected the future behaviour of the telecoms companies. He also notes that in the United Kingdom it was NTL Incorporated (which failed in its bid) which ended up in the most trouble financially, and questions whether the $100 billion cost of the auctions could explain the $700 billion drop in two years which was seen in the market capitalisation of the telecoms companies.

Subsequent spectrum auctions
Subsequent government auctions of the 3G radio spectrum, in Australia and New Zealand were met with low bids, and strong suspicion of collusion between operators of bidding low and secretly defining network sharing agreements.

Hong Kong's 2013 approach was to share in the profit from a spectrum allocation rather than issue a potentially damaging upfront payment for licences. Britain's 2013 UK spectrum auction for 4G fell £1 billion short of the stated target of £3.5 billion. The pension liabilities also added to the financial troubles of telecom companies and the 2013 auctions in the United Kingdom produced disappointing results.

References

 Prosperity from Technology - a new approach to industrial production, money and the environment - David Rudd 

Recessions
History of telecommunications
2001 in economics
2000s economic history
Dot-com bubble